A flare is a device that produces brilliant light and intense heat without explosion, used for lighting, signaling, decoration or as aerial defense countermeasure

Flare may also refer to:

Astronomy
 Flare star, a variable star that can undergo unpredictable dramatic increases in brightness for a few minutes
 Satellite flare, a phenomenon caused by the reflective surfaces on satellites
 Solar flare, an eruption of plasma from the surface of the sun

Aviation
 Flare (aviation), a technique used in landing an aircraft where the descent rate is gradually reduced until the landing gear gently touches the ground or runway
 Flare (countermeasure), an aerial countermeasure against heat-seeking missiles
 Flarecraft, a wing-in-ground effect vehicle
 Sky Flare, a Czech paraglider design

Computing
 Flare Technology, a defunct computer hardware company
 Xara Flare, a file format in computing

Culture and arts
 Flare (Techno-Cultural Fest), a techno-cultural fest, celebrated every year at Pandit Deendayal Petroleum University
 Bell-bottoms, a style of trousers sometimes referred to as "flares"

Engineering
 Flare (ship), a descriptive measure of hull shape
 Flare fitting, an expansion flare on the end of a pipe in plumbing 
 Gas flare or "flare stack", a gas combustion device used at industrial plants and work sites, especially those involving petroleum or natural gas
 Routine flaring, the practice of disposing of massive amounts of petroleum gas during crude oil extraction

Media
 Flare (film), a 2014 French-Japanese film starring Mayuko Fukuda
 Flare (album), a 2008 album by Hitomi Shimatani
 Flare (scratch), a type of scratch used by turntablists
 "Flare", a song by pop punk band Relient K on the album Forget and Not Slow Down
  Flare, a female hero who is a member of the League_of_Champions
 Flare (magazine), a Canadian fashion and style magazine
 Flare (novel), a 1992 book by Roger Zelazny and Thomas Timoux Thomas
 The Flare, a fictional TV series with an aftershow What Just Happened??! with Fred Savage
 "Flare", a song by Disarmonia Mundi from their EP The Restless Memoirs, from Nebularium

Medicine
 Flare-up, a recurrence or aggravation of symptoms of a medical condition
 An occurrence during slit lamp examinations

Photography
 Lens flare, unwanted reflections in optical systems that are a problem in photography and astronomy
 Fluid-attenuated inversion recovery, a pulse sequence used in magnetic resonance imaging, a medical diagnostic tool

Other
 Flare (acrobatic move), an acrobatic move employed in breakdancing and gymnastics
 Flares (horse) (born 1933), American-bred, British-trained Thoroughbred racehorse
 MV Flare, a 1972 Cypriot-registered bulk carrier
 Team Flare, a fictional villainous team from Pokémon X and Y
 Flare (phone), an Android smartphone

See also
 Flair (disambiguation)